The Ouergha River or Oued Ouerrha (Berber: Asif n Wergha)(Arabic:واد ورغة) is a watercourse in Morocco that is tributary to the Sebou River.

History
The Ouergha River was a key battle site in the French invasion of Morocco in the year 1924. The French, encouraging the fighting of native Moroccan tribes among each other, advanced with 12,000 troops to a crossing of the Ouergha and achieved a major victory here without a shot being fired.

Natural history
In the upper parts of the watershed within the Middle Atlas is the prehistoric range of the endangered primate Barbary macaque, which animal prehistorically had a much larger range in North Africa.

See also

 Baht River
 Middle Atlas

Line notes

References
 C. Michael Hogan. 2008. Barbary Macaque: Macaca sylvanus, GlobalTwitcher.com, ed. N. Stromberg
 William A. Hoisington. 2005. Lyautey and the French conquest of Morocco

Rivers of Morocco